Wolniewicz is a Polish surname. It may refer to:

 Adam Wolniewicz (born 1993), Polish footballer
 Bogusław Wolniewicz (1927–2017), Polish philosopher
 Claire Wolniewicz (born 1966), French journalist and writer

See also
 

Polish-language surnames